Out of Captivity, subtitled Surviving 1,967 Days in the Colombian Jungle, is a 2009 book written by Marc Gonsalves, Keith Stansell, and Thomas Howes with the assistance of author Gary Brozek. It narrates the nearly five and a half years they spent in the Colombian jungle as prisoners of the FARC, an insurgent organization, which accused them of being members of the CIA after their plane crashed in a mountainous region on February 13, 2003.

Marc Gonsalves, served in the USAF, Keith Stansell was a Marine, and Tom Howes is a professional pilot. They were civilian contractors working for the U.S. Department of Defense at the time of the accident.

References
 Book Excerpt: 'Out of Captivity: Surviving 1,967 Days in the Colombian Jungle'
 Vicepresidente recibió libro ‘Out of Captivity’, de los contratistas estadounidenses rescatados  (In Spanish)

2009 non-fiction books
Books about Colombia
FARC